Adventures in Emceein is the ninth solo studio album by American rapper KRS-One. It was released in early 2008 via Echo-Vista. Production was handled by Duane "DaRock" Ramos, Adam Deitch, Alex Track, Chris Pinset, KDL, Lounge Lizzards, M.I.C., QF, Adam Smirnoff, Bam Beats, Enoch, James Desmond, Nick Kasper, Panauh Kalayeh, Robert Hernandez, Stevie J and KRS-One himself, with Jeffrey Collins serving as executive producer. It features guest appearances from S-Five, Carlet Boseman, Chuck D, Cx, Keith Stewart, MC Lyte, Non-Stop, Pee-Doe, Vince Flores, Just Blaze, Nas and Rakim.

Track listing

References

2008 albums
KRS-One albums
Albums produced by KRS-One
Albums produced by Stevie J